Prostanthera aspalathoides, commonly known as scarlet mint-bush, is a species of flowering plant that is endemic to south-eastern Australia. It is a small shrub with hairy branches, cylindrical or linear to elliptic or oblong leaves and red, pinkish red, or orange flowers arranged singly in leaf axils.

Description
Flowering mainly occurs in spring but flowers may be present in most months.

Taxonomy and naming
Prostanthera aspalathoides was first formally described in 1834 by George Bentham in his book Labiatarum genera et species, from an unpublished description by Allan Cunningham who collected the type specimens near the Lachlan River. The specific epithet alludes to a similarity to plants of the genus Aspalathus.

Distribution and habitat
Scarlet mint bush grows in mallee and occurs in New South Wales, Victoria and South Australia. It is found west from the Rankins Springs district in New South Wales, in the northern half of Victoria and in the south-east of South Australia, including the Yorke and Eyre Peninsulas and Kangaroo Island.

Uses

Use in horticulture
Prosthanthera aspalthioides is best adapted to cultivation in dry conditions with low humidity. Plants prefer a position in full sun or partial shade with good drainage and withstand moderate frost.
Cuttings are the preferred propagation method, as seed germinates slowly. Plants may also be grafted on roostocks of the hardier species Prostanthera nivea.

Fragrant oil
Tests to extract cineole (also known as eucalyptol), a fragrant oil found in Prostanthera were conducted over 100 years ago by Joseph Bosisto an industrial chemist and oil distiller.  Later tests on Prostanthera aspalathoides produced an oil yield of 2-3%.

References

External links
Occurrence data from Australasian Virtual Herbarium for Prostanthera aspalathoides.

aspalathoides
Flora of New South Wales
Flora of South Australia
Flora of Victoria (Australia)
Lamiales of Australia
Plants described in 1834
Taxa named by Allan Cunningham (botanist)